Amanmurad Hommadov (Turkmen: Amanmyrat Hommadow; born January 28, 1989) is a Turkmenistani hammer thrower. Hommadov represented Turkmenistan at the 2008 Summer Olympics in Beijing, where he competed for the men's hammer throw. He received no mark in the qualifying round, after failing to throw the hammer at a specific distance in three successive attempts.

Hommadov threw his personal best of 69.15 metres at a national meet in Ashgabat.

References

External links

NBC Olympics Profile

Turkmenistan male hammer throwers
Living people
People from Ahal Region
Olympic athletes of Turkmenistan
Athletes (track and field) at the 2008 Summer Olympics
Athletes (track and field) at the 2016 Summer Olympics
1989 births
Athletes (track and field) at the 2010 Asian Games
World Athletics Championships athletes for Turkmenistan
Asian Games competitors for Turkmenistan
21st-century Turkmenistan people